CVSS may refer to:

Common Vulnerability Scoring System, a standard for assessing computer system vulnerabilities
Compassvale Secondary School, a secondary school in Sengkang, Singapore